In agriculture, shattering is the dispersal of a crop's seeds upon their becoming ripe. From an agricultural perspective this is generally an undesirable process, and in the history of crop domestication several important advances have involved a mutation in a crop plant that reduced shattering—instead of the seeds being dispersed as soon as they were ripe, the mutant plants retained the seeds for longer, which made harvesting much more effective. Non-shattering phenotype is one of the prerequisites for plant breeding especially when introgressing valuable traits from wild varieties of domesticated crops.

A particularly important mutation that was selected very early in the history of agriculture removed the "brittle rachis" problem from wheat. A ripe head ("ear") of wild-type wheat is easily shattered into dispersal units when touched, or blown by the wind, because during ripening a series of abscission layers forms that divides the rachis into short segments, each attached to a single spikelet (which contains 2–3 grains along with chaff).

A different class of shattering mechanisms involves dehiscence of the mature fruit, which releases the seeds.

Current research priorities to understand the genetics of shattering include the following crops:
 Barley
 Buckwheat
 Grain Amaranth
 Oilseed rape (Brassica napus)

Sesame and rapeseed are harvested before the seed is fully mature, so that the pods do not split and drop the seeds.

References

History of agriculture
Mutation